Frederick L. Christ (born August 6, 1930) is a retired American basketball player. He played collegiately for Fordham University.

He played in 6 games for the New York Knicks (1954–55) in the NBA.

External links

1930 births
Living people
American men's basketball players
Basketball players from New York City
Fordham Rams men's basketball players
New York Knicks players
Shooting guards
Sportspeople from Queens, New York
Undrafted National Basketball Association players